Sweet Tooth is an American comic book limited series written and drawn by Canadian Jeff Lemire and published by DC Comics' Vertigo imprint. Dubbed by some as "Mad Max meets Bambi", it takes place in a mostly rural post-apocalyptic setting where some creatures are human/animal hybrids. Following the conclusion of the original series in January 2013, a sequel, subtitled The Return, began publication in November 2020, while a television series adaptation was released on Netflix on June 4, 2021.

Plot summary
Gus, a young boy with deer-like features, lives a quiet life deep in the woods with his father. He learns many things, from medical care to religious prophecy. Though he loves his religious father, he yearns to escape as he learns that there is not fire past the trees but simply more land.

Sometime after Gus' father passes away from an illness, strange men come to capture him. They are slain by Jepperd, who then promises to take Gus to a sanctuary. Lonely, Gus goes with him. Along the way, they encounter many problems. Hybrid cultists almost kill Jepperd but Gus saves him. 'Sweet Tooth' then earns his nickname by eating all of Jepperd's candy and food stash, though he had gained more food while Jepperd recovered. The duo also rescued several women from a prostitution ring.

Ultimately, Jepperd betrays Gus to a horrible scientific facility in return for the remains of his wife. It turns out a mysterious plague has been wiping out humanity, and the leader of the facility, Abbot, along with scientist Dr. Singh, believe the half-animal half-human children hybrids have something to do with it. In flashback we learn Jepperd was a former hockey bruiser who protected his wife Louise in the post-apocalyptic world. Eventually though, Louise revealed she was pregnant and Jepperd relents when a militia, led by Abbot, offers protection. It was all a trick however, with Abbot and Singh experimenting on pregnant women and hybrid babies to try to find a cure for the plague. Jepperd is kept in a cage but is eventually freed by Abbot's brother Johnny, a guard in the facility. Johnny tells Jepperd his wife is dead, and Jepperd goes on a rampage through the facility. He is recaptured, and Abbot lets him out of the camp, telling him he can have his wife's remains if he brings Abbot a hybrid child. This was why Jepperd betrayed Gus, and he heads home to fulfill a promise to his wife that he would "bring her back home".

Gus, despite the horrors, makes friends with the last of the animal children at the place, the pig girl Wendy, half feral groundhog boy Bobby, and the silent donkey boy Buddy. Gus is hypnotized by Dr Singh, who goes deep into his memory to find out the truth about his birth. He discovers that Gus's father was a lunatic, and may even have been responsible for the apocalypse. He insists Abbot take him to the woods. They discover a bible that was written by Gus's father, but no evidence of a mother in her grave, on the way back to the camp, Singh starts to believe the writings. Jepperd, overwhelmed with guilt and a directionless life, decides to re-rescue Gus. He recruits Becky and Lucy, the women he saved, and hundreds of hybrid cultists. With help from Johnny, the children escape, although Gus is forced to kill a lost alligator-child who had gone feral. While on the move, Jepperd and Gus share an identical dream about Alaska.

A battle and the intervention of Johnny allow Jepperd and the women to escape with the children and Dr Singh, who insists on coming. Seemingly, Buddy is lost to the murderous attentions of the hybrid cultists, and at the same time, he seems to think Jepperd is his father. Despite the emotional turmoil, the group closes ranks to protect the children still with them. Buddy is taken by Abbot, who murders the head cultist to do so. Somehow, the headmaster is now friendly and sympathetic towards the injured, moaning boy. Gus, Jepperd, Becky, Lucy, Wendy, Bobby, Johnny, and Singh stumble across a mysterious dam.

Influence
Although the story is initially set in Nebraska, the landscape is inspired by Lemire's past home of Essex County, Ontario.

Sweet Tooth, as a post-apocalyptic parable, is rife with influences such as Tim Truman’s Scout: War Shaman and the Winterworld three issue mini-series. As well as art influence by Richard Corben's A Boy and His Dog written by Harlan Ellison and The Punisher: The End, written by Garth Ennis.

Publication history
Twelve issues were slated for Sweet Tooths first year (as part of Lemire's initial contract). Because the nature of monthly comics is dependent on sales, initially not even Jeff Lemire knew how many issues Sweet Tooth would run. Editor Brandon Montclare confirmed, "Sweet Tooth is taken down and rebuilt every issue—sometimes every page. And as far down the road as I can see, who knows where Gus’ journey ends. Not even Jeff knows yet, although it's in his head somewhere." The main plot points were planned out with loosely 40 issues for DC/Vertigo, and in an interview for USA Today, Jeff Lemire was quoted: "right now, I have it planned out to be 20 to 30 issues, but it could go even further depending on the response it gets."

On May 7, 2012, Jeff Lemire announced that Sweet Tooth would be finishing with a double size special at #40.
In January 2015, an 8-page Sweet Tooth short story titled Sweet Tooth: Black was published in Vertigo Quarterly: CMYK #4 Black. In August 2020, a sequel series subtitled The Return was announced, set 300 years later and following a cloned Gus, beginning publication in November 2020.

Characters
Gus — A 9-year-old boy with antlers, the first of a new breed of human/animal hybrid that appeared after an apocalyptic pandemic of an unknown virus. Raised alone by his religious father in a nature preserve in Nebraska, he decides to leave his forest home with Jepperd after his father dies of an unknown illness.
Tommy Jepperd — A hulking, violent drifter who takes in Gus and promises to lead him to "The Preserve" (a fabled safe-haven for hybrid children). The character was based on an aged Frank Castle (Marvel's "The Punisher"). "Corben’s aging gray-haired Frank is an unstoppable force of nature and amazing to behold. This character design ended up being a huge influence on the design of Jepperd, the big bad ass in Sweet Tooth."
Dr. Singh — A scientist that experiments on hybrid Human/Animals. He takes special interest in Gus because his apparent age predates the pandemic.
 Wendy — A hybrid pig girl Gus meets in the militia camp. She seems to be around the same age as Gus. She was raised by a single mother, and takes to Lucy and Jepperd as mother and father figures.

Issues

Other Sweet Tooth stories:
Sweet Tooth: Black (8-page short story) in: Vertigo Quarterly CMYK #4 (anthology, 2015) collected in CMYK (tpb, 296 pages, 2015)

Television series adaptation

On November 16, 2018, it was announced that streaming service Hulu had given a pilot order to a potential television series adaptation of the comic book series. The pilot is expected to be written and directed by Jim Mickle who is also set to executive produce alongside Robert Downey Jr., Susan Downey, Amanda Burrell, and Linda Moran. Production companies involved with the pilot are slated to consist of Team Downey and Warner Bros. Television. On April 9, 2020, it was announced that the series has been moved from Hulu to Netflix. On May 12, 2020, Netflix had given the production a series order for a first season consisting of eight episodes. Sweet Tooth premiered on June 4, 2021.

Notes

References

External links

Comics adapted into television series
Comics by Jeff Lemire